The Road to Sunrise is a 2017 Malawian drama film directed by Shemu Joyah. It was selected as the Malawian entry for the Best Foreign Language Film at the 91st Academy Awards, but it was not nominated. It was the first film to be submitted by Malawi in the Foreign Language Oscar category.

Cast
 Tapiwa Gwaza as Nanawake
 Bright Kabota as Lamba

See also
 List of submissions to the 91st Academy Awards for Best Foreign Language Film
 List of Malawian submissions for the Academy Award for Best Foreign Language Film

References

External links
 

2017 films
2017 drama films
Chewa-language films
Malawian drama films